Declan James (born 19 April 1993 in Nottingham) is a professional squash player who represented England. He reached a career-high world ranking of World No. 15 in May 2019.

References

External links 

English male squash players
Living people
1993 births
Commonwealth Games medallists in squash
Commonwealth Games bronze medallists for England
Squash players at the 2018 Commonwealth Games
Medallists at the 2018 Commonwealth Games